Eucynodontia ("true dog teeth") is a clade of cynodont therapsids including mammals and most non-mammalian cynodonts. The oldest eucynodonts are known from the Early Triassic and possibly Late Permian. Eucynodontia includes two major subgroups, Cynognathia and Probainognathia.

The clade was named in 1982 by Thomas Kemp, who defined it as all cynodonts more derived than Thrinaxodon.

In 2001, Hopson and Kitching redefined the clade Eucynodontia as the least inclusive group containing Mammalia and Exaeretodon.

References

Cynodonts
Extant Early Triassic first appearances